Yves Krattinger (born 5 November 1948) was a member of the Senate of France, who represented the Haute-Saône department.  He is a member of the Socialist Party.

References
Page on the Senate website

1948 births
Living people
French Senators of the Fifth Republic
Socialist Party (France) politicians
Senators of Haute-Saône
Place of birth missing (living people)